Ihor Rostyslavovych Petrashko (born 6 October 1975) is a Ukrainian economist and politician. From 17 March 2020 until 18 May 2021 he was the Minister of Economic Development and Trade.

Biography 
He studied at the Lviv Polytechnic. In 2001, he received an MBA from the Vanderbilt University (United States).

Petrashko worked as a corporate restructuring consultant. He also worked at the Kyiv office of Ernst & Young.

From 2007 to 2013, he held positions at the (Ukrainian subsidiary of the Russian investment company) Troika Dialog Ukraine Investment Company. From 2012 to 2013 Petrashko worked in Russia where he headed a corporate business department of Sberbank (Troika Dialog is one of the investors in Sberbank).

Since April 2013, Petrashko was Deputy General Director of UkrLandFarming.

On 17 March 2020 Petrashko was appointed as the Minister of Economic Development, Trade and Agriculture. On 17 December 2020 this ministry lost its responsibility for Ukraine's agricultural policy because that day Roman Leshchenko was appointed as Minister of Agricultural Policy and Food.

On 14 May 2021 Petrashko offered his resignation as Minister, according to a source of UNIAN he was "stepping down due to inefficient performance." On 18 May 2021 the Ukrainian parliament dismissed him as Minister.

Family
Petrashko is married to Svetlana, a citizen of Russia where she co-owns a third of a 109-square-meter flat in Moscow's Donskoy District. She also owns real estate in Ukraine.

See also 
 Shmyhal Government

References

External links 
 Cabinet of Ministers

1975 births
Living people
People from Stryi
Lviv Polytechnic alumni
Vanderbilt University alumni
University of Lviv alumni
Ukrainian expatriates in Russia
Ministry of Economic Development, Trade and Agriculture
Agriculture ministers of Ukraine
Independent politicians in Ukraine
21st-century Ukrainian economists
21st-century Ukrainian politicians